Sugi, stylized SUGi, is an American conservation organization and app that supports afforestation. Found in 2019, the platform seeks to increase biodiversity through native plant rewilding projects. Employing the Miyawaki method, SUGi has funded 124 projects and forests in 15 countries, including in Cambridge, Massachusetts, Hong Kong, and London, United Kingdom.

References 

Nature conservation organizations based in the United States